The Bremen Ratskeller is the council wine cellar (German: "Ratskeller") of the Townhall of Bremen. Since it was erected in the year 1405, German wines were stored and sold there. With its history over 600 years the Ratskeller of Bremen is one of the oldest wine cellars of Germany, furthermore the oldest wine barrel of Germany, a wine from Rüdesheim which is dated 1653, is stored here.

In the cellar there has long been a traditional tavern and today a large part of it is a gourmet restaurant.

History 
Since 1330, the Council of Bremen held the privilege of white wine which was valid until 1815. No citizen could sell wine without the permission of the Council. All wines had to be stored in the Cellar of the Council. The purpose was to control the prices and the payment of taxes.

With about 650 varieties the Ratskeller has the world's greatest selection of German wines exclusively; in total, there are about 1,200 different spirits available.

Rooms of the cellar 

 The large Hall
 In front of the Bacchus
 Hauff's Hall
 The Rose Cellar
 The Rooms for the Senate of Bremen and the Kaiser
 The Bacchus Cellar
 Treasure Room

Famous guests

See also
 List of oldest companies

References

Literature 
 Hermann Entholt: The Ratskeller in Bremen. Translated from the German by Harold Styring, Bremen 1930.

External links
www.rathaus.bremen.de (Bremen's official website on its townhall): Ratskeller/Council Cellar – The Ratskeller of Rathaus
http://www.bremer-ratskeller.eu/

Ratskeller
Tourist attractions in Bremen (state)